The 2004 Giro d'Italia was the 87th edition of the Giro d'Italia, one of cycling's Grand Tours. It began in Genoa with a  prologue. The race came to a close with a  mass-start road stage that stretched from Clusone to Milan. Nineteen teams entered the race that was won by the Italian Damiano Cunego of the  team. Second and third were the Ukrainian Serhiy Honchar and Italian Gilberto Simoni.

In the race's other classifications,  rider Fabian Wegmann won the mountains classification, Raffaele Illiano of the  team won the intergiro classification, and  rider Alessandro Petacchi won the points classification. In addition to the points classification, Petacchi also won the secondary most combative and Azzurri d'Italia classifications.  finished as the winners of the Trofeo Fast Team classification, ranking each of the nineteen teams contesting the race by lowest cumulative time.

Teams

A total of 19 teams were invited to participate in the 2004 Giro d'Italia. Each team sent a squad of nine riders, so the Giro began with a peloton of 171 cyclists. Out of the 171 riders that started this edition of the Giro d'Italia, a total of 140 riders made it to the finish in Milan.

The 19 teams that took part in the race were:

Route and stages

The route for the 2004 Giro d'Italia was unveiled by race director Angelo Zomegnan on 8 November 2003 in Milan. It contained two time trial events, all of which were individual. The organizers divided the remaining nineteen stages into three categories: flat stages, rolling stages, and mountain stages. Twelve of the stages were declared flat stages. Of the seven stages remaining, three stages were designated rolling stages and three were ranked as mountain stages. In the stages containing categorized climbs, three had summit finishes: stage 3, to Corno alle Scale; stage 7, to Montevergine di Mercogliano; and stage 18, to Bormio 2000. The organizers chose to include two rest days. When compared to the previous year's race, the race was  shorter, contained the same amount of rest days, and the same amount of time trials. In addition, this race opened with a prologue, which the last year's race did not.

Race overview

The 2004 Giro d'Italia began with a  prologue around the Italian city of Genoa. Bradley McGee won the first leg of the race after besting the second place rider Olaf Pollack by ten seconds. The race's first mass-start stage came down to a sprint finish in the city of Alba. The stage was won by Italian sprinter Alessandro Petacchi and Pollack managed to take the race lead after earning a twelve-second time bonus by finishing second on the stage. Stage 2 saw the race lead switch back to McGee after he finished second to the stage winner Damiano Cunego.

Success in stages was limited to eight of the competing teams, three of which achieved multiple stage victories, while two individual riders won multiple stages. The riders that won more than once were Alessandro Petacchi in stages 1, 4, 6, 8, 10, 12, 14, 15, and 20 and Damiano Cunego in stages 2, 7, 16, and 18.  won nine stages with Petacchi.  won five stages, four with Cunego and one with Gilberto Simoni in stage 3.  won two stages, with Pavel Tonkov in stage 17 and Stefano Garzelli in stage 19.

FDJeux.com won the opening prologue with Bradley McGee. Lotto-Domo's Robbie McEwen won stage 4 by out-sprinting the rest of the field for the stage win, as did Acqua & Sapone rider Fred Rodriguez in stage 9. Ceramica Panaria-Margres's Emanuele Sella won the hilly stage 11. De Nardi rider Serhiy Honchar won the stage 13 individual time trial.

Classification leadership

In the 2004 Giro d'Italia, four different jerseys were awarded. For the general classification, calculated by adding each cyclist's finishing times on each stage, and allowing time bonuses for the first three finishers on mass-start stages, the leader received a pink jersey. This classification is considered the most important of the Giro d'Italia, and the winner is considered the winner of the Giro.

Additionally, there was a points classification, which awarded a mauve jersey. In the points classification, cyclists got points for finishing in the top 15 in a stage. The stage win awarded 25 points, second place awarded 20 points, third 16, fourth 14, fifth 12, sixth 10, and one point fewer per place down the line, to a single point for 15th. In addition, points could be won in intermediate sprints.

There was also a mountains classification, which awarded a green jersey. In the mountains classifications, points were won by reaching the top of a mountain before other cyclists. Each climb was categorized as either first, second, or third category, with more points available for the higher-categorized climbs. The highest point in the Giro (called the Cima Coppi), which in 2004 was Passo di Gavia, afforded more points than the other first-category climbs.

The fourth jersey represented the intergiro classification, marked by a blue jersey. The calculation for the intergiro is similar to that of the general classification, in each stage there is a midway point that the riders pass through a point and where their time is stopped. As the race goes on, their times compiled and the person with the lowest time is the leader of the intergiro classification and wears the blue jersey.

There were also two classifications for teams. The first was the Trofeo Fast Team. In this classification, the times of the best three cyclists per team on each stage were added; the leading team was the team with the lowest total time. The Trofeo Super Team was a team points classification, with the top 20 placed riders on each stage earning points (20 for first place, 19 for second place and so on, down to a single point for 20th) for their team.

The rows in the following table correspond to the jerseys awarded after that stage was run.

Final standings

General classification

Points classification

Mountains classification

Intergiro classification

Trofeo Fast Team classification

Trofeo Super Team classification

Minor classifications

Other less well-known classifications, whose leaders did not receive a special jersey, were awarded during the Giro. Other awards included the Combativity classification, which was a compilation of points gained for position on crossing intermediate sprints, mountain passes and stage finishes. Italian Alessandro Petacchi won the Most Combative classification. The Azzurri d'Italia classification was based on finishing order, but points were awarded only to the top three finishers in each stage. The Azzurri d'Italia classification was also won by Alessandro Petacchi. The Trofeo Fuga Piaggio classification rewarded riders who took part in a breakaway at the head of the field, each rider in an escape of ten or fewer riders getting one point for each kilometre that the group stayed clear. The classification was won by Daniele Righi. Teams were given penalty points for minor technical infringements.  was the most successful in avoiding penalties, and so won the Fair Play classification.

References

Citations

 
2004 in road cycling
Giro d'Italia
2004
May 2004 sports events in Europe